This is a list of the National Register of Historic Places listings in Coryell County, Texas.

This is intended to be a complete list of properties and districts listed on the National Register of Historic Places in Coryell County, Texas. There are one district and three properties listed on the National Register in the county. Two individual properties are State Antiquities Landmarks while the third is a Recorded Texas Historic Landmark.

Current listings

The locations of National Register properties and districts may be seen in a mapping service provided.

|}

See also

National Register of Historic Places listings in Texas
Recorded Texas Historic Landmarks in Coryell County

References

External links

Coryell County, Texas
Coryell County
Buildings and structures in Coryell County, Texas